The history of Sonsonate FC, a professional soccer team based in Sonsonate, El Salvador, spans over six decades. The first team based in Sonsonate was Ferrocarril club of the now-defunct league, playing from 1943 to 1950. 
After seven years, a new team was formed with some of the Ferrocarril players to form a new team, the first team to use the "Sonsonate" name. This team conituned until 1951.
After 1951, Ferrocarril and Sonsonate joined forces to form a new team; Leones. Leones continued to play as a club (playing in the primera division and segunda division) until 1966.
This team bought back the Sonsonate name in 1966 and operated continuously in various leagues until 2002.
The club became defunct and a team was set in 2008 called Alba-Acajutla, they played one season in segunda division before mounting debt caused them to become defunct.
A Sonsonate FC team began again in 2009 and starting in 2015 began playing in the primera division making it the first time since 1999 that a "Sonsonate" team played in the top tier of soccer in El Salvador.

F.C. Sonsonate

Founded in 1948, the club was known as CD Sonsonate, playing in the town of Sonsonate, and that is the name used most often. Despite several name changes the club always follows the lineage of titles and history back to the Sonsonate name.
The club won promotion to the primera division in 1998, however one season later they were relegated 
The club currently competes in the Terecea Division since the 2012 season.

Ferrocarril

The team competed for many years in the Salvadoran Sports Commission national week football tournament. In 1943, Ferrocarril won the Occidental Zone of El Salvador, and played in the final round with Central Zone winners Quequeisque and Oriental Zone winners Luis Ángel Firpo. They finished second in the group, runners-up to Quequeisque. Ferrocarril did not return to the first division of El Salvador after failing to enter the 1951–52 league. They later renamed themselves as Leones.

Leones

The Leones arrived in the national league in the 1951–52 season, simply since the Salvadoran Football Federation had no institutionalised relegation rules. In their first year, the Leones finished runners-up to FAS. After five years in the league, they were relegated to the second division in the 1955–56 season. They returned to the first division in 1958, not before being relegated again in the 1960–61 season. The Leones failed to be promoted for a third time. They were renamed CD Sonsonate in 1967.

Alba-Acajutla

Founded in 2008, the club was known as CD Alba-Acajutla, also playing in the town of Sonsonate. However, after poor attendance and financial struggle, the team sold their spot in the second division and reverted to their original form.

F.C. Sonsonate rebirth and modern history (2009–Current)

On 9 September 2009, Cesar Antonio Contreras and Miguel Antonio Castillo along with Pedro Antonio Contreras and with the support of the Sonsonate department (in particular the head of the department José Roberto Aquino) were able to re-activate Sonsonate from defunct status and begin their time in the modern era.

The club competed in the Tercera Division for a few years, before winning promotion to the Segunda Division in 2011 under the direction of Ricardo Andrés Navarro.

Despite strong club following and several finals appearances the club failed to win the Apertura and Clausura title to achieve promotion in the Primera Division.

However, on the 12 July 2015, the club purchased the spot of recently promoted Real Destroyer meaning the club will participate in the Primera division for the first time in fifteen years (last time was 1999).

Honours

Domestic

Managers 

 Sonsonate (1948-1955)

 Ferrocarril (1943-1951)

 Leones (1951-1967)

 Sonsonate (1967-2003)

 Alba-Acajutla

 Sonsonate (2009-2021)

Club records
 First victory in the Primera Division for Sonsonate: 1–0 Santa Tecla 28 January 2016
 First goalscorer in the Primera Division for Sonsonate: Augusto do Carmo v Dragon 1 November 2015
 Largest Home victory, Primera División: 3–0 v Pasaquina, 23 April 2018
 Largest Away victory, Primera División: 3–0 v FAS, 27 November 2016
 Largest Home loss, Primera División: 0–4 v Alianza, 12 December 2016
 Largest Away loss, Primera División: 0–4 v FAS, 3 April 2016  0–4 v UES, 27 April 2016
 Highest home attendance: 81,000 v Primera División, 23 May 1959
 Highest away attendance: 127,621 v Primera División, Hampden Park, Glasgow, 18 May 1960
 Highest average attendance, season: 49,176, Primera División
 Most appearances, Primera División: 602, TBD 1972–1991
 Most goals scored, Primera División: 35, Primera División Apertura 2016
 Most goals scored, season, Primera División: 35, Primera División Apertura 2016

Individual records
 Record appearances (all competitions): TBD, 822 from 1957 to 1975
 Record appearances (Primera Division):  Salvadoran Edson Melendez, 140 from 2016-2021
 Most capped player for El Salvador: 63 (0 whilst at Sonsonate), Juan Jose Gomez
 Most international caps for El Salvador while an El Vencedor player: 2, Henry Hernandez
 Most caps won whilst at Sonsonate: 2, Henry Hernandez.
 Record scorer in league: TBD, 396
 Most goals in a season (all competitions): TBD, 62 (1927/28) (47 in League, 15 in Cup competitions)
 Most goals in a season (Primera Division): Armando Polo, 13

Most appearances 

Bolded players are currently on the Sonsonate roster.

Goals

Bolded players are currently on the Once Deportivo roster.

Historical Matches

Notes

External links
 
 http://www.elgrafico.com/LMF/sonsonate/35/6881

History
Sonsonate